Fan The Fury is the name of Aloud's follow up to their 2006 debut full-length Leave Your Light On. It is the only Aloud album containing music credited as written by all four original members of the band, as well as the last to feature bassist Roy Fontaine and drummer Ross Lohr. The album was produced by Sony mix engineer Chuck Brody.

Fan The Fury was released on March 25, 2008 on Lemon Merchant Records.

Album cover
The cover of Fan The Fury is a plain off-white canvas with a painting of a portion of Deux Furies, with one half of the image on either side of the sleeve. The image, now in the public domain, is a 19th-century reproduction of a design on an ancient vase of the Erinyes of Greek mythology. Photographs of Aloud for the inside were taken by Mick Murray. Like previous Aloud albums the sleeve was put together by Henry Beguiristain, credited as "Big Hen".

A digital booklet was created and made available for free download in Adobe Acrobat format containing additional photographs by Mick Murray and the full lyrics to the album.

The album artwork also featured a new "Aloud" logo, replacing the original which had been in use by the band since its inception.

Reception

Upon its release, Fan The Fury received a warm welcome from press, extolling it as a more mature effort than Leave Your Light On.  Praise was also given to the guitar work, the "propelling" beats, and the vocal interplay between singers Jen and Henry. Phil Ramone and Danielle Evin described the melodies as "ear-catching", in particular singling out the title track. Despite the praise, Fan The Fury did receive the band's most scathing review to date, with a UK blog calling it "a globulous mass of musical phlegm.". Opinions on the political overtones of Fan The Fury also varied, running the gamut from those who believed it enhanced the record to those who believed it was the album's weakness. This was not lost on the band, who in an interview said the intent was to release a record on an election year that would either be loved or hated.

To date, Fan The Fury has remained on The Noise Top 30 Radio Chart, peaking at #2, but generally remaining in the Top 10. The album did better on college radio than Leave Your Light On, with 100 college radio stations around the United States adding it to their rotation.

Track listing

Personnel

Aloud
 Henry Beguiristain - lead vocals, guitar, piano, synths
 Jen de la Osa - lead vocals, guitar, piano, Rhodes
 Roy Fontaine - bass, backing vocals
 Ross Lohr - drums, percussion

Additional personnel
 Wendy Mittelstadt - strings
 Chuck Brody - producer, mixing
 Jeff Lipton - mastering
 Maria Rice - assistant engineer (mastering)
 Hugh Wyman - "Sinister Swami"

Live 2009
 
Live 2009 is the name of a live EP released by Aloud on December 31, 2009 featuring songs from Fan The Fury. Live 2009 was released after the conclusion of the Fan The Fury tour as a free digital download. The EP was recorded on November 18, 2009 in Pittsburgh, PA at Howler's Coyote Cafe. It was recorded and mixed by Bengt Alexsander.

Reception

Playground Boston called Live 2009 "excellent", and praised the live aspect of the EP by saying "the energy in each song is fierce and palpable".

Track listing

Personnel
Aloud
 Henry Beguiristain - lead vocals, guitar
 Jen de la Osa - lead vocals, guitar

Additional personnel
 Bengt Alexsander - recording and mixing
 Tommy Mazalewski - drums
 Charles Murphy - bass, backing vocals

References

2008 albums
Aloud albums